Germania was a German fishing trawler that was requisitioned by the Kriegsmarine in the Second World War for use as a Vorpostenboot, serving as V 403 Germania and V 410 Germania. She sank in the Gironde Estuary in August 1944.

Description
The engine was built by Howaldtswerke AG, Kiel, Germany and was rated at 79nhp. It drove a single screw propeller.

History
Germania was built as yard number 753 by Howaldtswerke AG, Kiel, Germany. She was launched on 11 July 1934 and completed on 4 August. She was built for N. Ebling Hochseefischerei, Bremerhaven, Germany.  The Code Letters DOPX were allocated, as was the fishing boat registration BX 248.

On 17 September 1939, she was requisitioned by the Kriegsmarine and commissioned with 4 Vorpostenflotille as the Vorpostenboot V 403 Germania. On 16 October 1939, she was redesignated V 410 Germania. On 12 August 1942, she was attacked by Bristol Beaufighter aircraft of 235 and 248 Squadrons, Royal Air Force and set afire. Germania sank in the Gironde Estuary with the loss of three of her crew.

References

Sources

1934 ships
Ships built in Kiel
Fishing vessels of Germany
Steamships of Germany
Auxiliary ships of the Kriegsmarine
Maritime incidents in August 1944
Shipwrecks in the Bay of Biscay
Ships sunk by British aircraft
Ships sunk by Canadian aircraft
World War II shipwrecks in the Atlantic Ocean